Bakkar is an Egyptian cartoon series that was produced by the Egyptian Radio and Television Union to be aired on Channel One and was traditionally broadcast during the Muslim holy month of Ramadan from 1998 to 2004, and from 2011 to 2015, running for a total of 11 seasons. 

The series revolves around the adventures of a young Nubian-Egyptian boy named Bakkar, his pet goat Rashida, and his friends. Its was written by Amr Samir Serif, and directed by award-winning Mona Abul-Nasr. The opening and closing songs are by famed Nubian-Egyptian singer Mohammed Mounir, and written by longtime collaborator Kawthar Mostafa. Sherif Nour is one of the composers.

Legacy 
A number of seasons can now be watched on the ERTU Maspero Atfal YouTube Channel. as well as via the Google Play app store.

References 

1990s Egyptian television series
2000s Egyptian television series
2010s Egyptian television series
1990s animated television series
2000s animated television series
2010s animated television series
Egyptian animated television series